Gabriel Debeljuh (born 28 September 1996) is a Croatian professional footballer who plays as a forward for Liga I club CFR Cluj.

Club career
Debeljuh started out as a senior in the Italian lower leagues with Piacenza Calcio, Mantova and A.C. Este respectively.

In summer 2019, Debeljuh signed for Romanian club Hermannstadt. After netting 12 times in the league and leading the club to a mid-table finish, he earned a transfer to defending champions CFR Cluj in 2020.

Career statistics

Club
As of 11 August 2022

Honours
CFR Cluj
Liga I: 2020–21, 2021–22
Supercupa României: 2020

References

External links

 
 
 
 
 Gabriel Debeljuh at lpf.ro

1996 births
Living people
Sportspeople from Pula
Association football forwards
Croatian footballers
Piacenza Calcio 1919 players
Mantova 1911 players
A.C. Este players
FC Hermannstadt players
CFR Cluj players
Serie C players
Serie D players
Liga I players
Croatian expatriate footballers
Croatian expatriate sportspeople in Italy
Expatriate footballers in Italy
Croatian expatriate sportspeople in Romania
Expatriate footballers in Romania